Langerwehe station is a station in the German state of North Rhine-Westphalia on the Cologne–Aachen high-speed railway. It is in the centre of Langerwehe in the district of Düren, about 25 km east of Aachen.

History 
The station was built in 1841 to coincide with the completion of the railway from Cologne to Aachen. The two-story central section of the station building dates from this period. Since the line originally served particularly freight traffic between the Belgian city of Antwerp and the Rhineland, a freight house was also established, which was partly used for the temporary storage of wood for the nearby coal mines of the Aachen district.

With the growing importance of passenger services at the end of the 19th century patronage of Langerwehe station increased strongly. At the beginning of the 20th century, the station was therefore significantly expanded, with a two-story extension added to the station building. The freight house became disused and was later partly demolished.

In the late 1990s and early 2000s the line from Cologne to Aachen was rebuilt as a high-speed line. In the station two additional tracks without platforms were built to provide continuous main tracks for through trains (including high-speed Intercity-Express and Thalys trains). Two new side platform were built for passenger services, track 1 (towards Cologne) and 4 (towards Aachen), each 220 metres long and interconnected by a pedestrian tunnel.

The latest renovation in 2009 created a new platform track 5 with a bus station and a "park and rail" parking area. Track 5 is adjacent to track 4, but separated from it by a sound barrier. This is a terminating track, used only by Euregiobahn services from Aachen ending in Langerwehe. These services connect to the main line a few hundred metres west of the station. These services can also run to the station on track 4 and, since the timetable change of December 2009, half of the Euregiobahn services operate to Düren.

Current operations

Langerwehe station is currently served exclusively by regional trains: each hour it is served by NRW-Express (RE 1) and Rhein-Sieg-Express (RE 9) services. In addition Langerwehe is served by Euregiobahn services on the Eschweiler Valley Railway from Weisweiler every half hour on the new line. These services continue every hour to Düren.

Notes

External links 
 

Railway stations in North Rhine-Westphalia
Railway stations in Germany opened in 1841
1841 establishments in Prussia
Buildings and structures in Düren (district)